The Union Dutchwomen represented Union College in ECAC women's ice hockey during the 2019–20 NCAA Division I women's ice hockey season.

Regular season

Standings

Schedule
Source: 

|-
!colspan=12 style="  "| Regular Season
|-

Roster

2019-20 Dutchwomen

Awards and honors
Bella McKee, ECAC Hockey Goaltender of the Week (Union) (awarded October 21, 2019)

References

Union
Union Dutchwomen ice hockey seasons